Eurogroup for Animals is an animal protection lobby group based in Brussels, Belgium, that seeks to improve animal welfare standards in the European Union. The association represents animal protection organisations in 26 of the 27 EU Member States and several other countries. Since it was launched in 1980, the association has succeeded in ensuring that the European Union is a world leader in animal welfare standards. Indeed, following the entry into force of the Treaty of Lisbon, a requirement has been included in the Treaty on the Functioning of the European Union (one of the two fundamental Treaties on which the Union is founded) stating that, since animals are sentient beings, the EU Institutions and the Member States must pay full regard to the welfare requirements of animals in the formulation and implementation of Union policy.

Eurogroup for Animals provides advice and expertise on animal welfare to various European institutions, such as the European Commission, the Council of the European Union, and the European Parliament. It also provides the secretariat of the European Parliamentary Intergroup on the Welfare and Conservation of Animals, which meets at the European Parliament in Strasbourg once a month.

Eurogroup for Animals also works closely together with retailers to encourage them to adopt higher standards of animal welfare. The association works to improve the welfare of animals that are farmed (poultry, bovines, ovines, caprines, swine, etc.) or caught wild for the purposes of human consumption (i.e. fish), animals used in science (rabbits, rodents, etc.), companion animals (conventional pets, such as dogs and cats, and animals kept for the purposes of companionship, such as equines) and wild animals.

History

The British RSPCA founded Eurogroup for Animals in 1980 (Britain was at the time in the European Community) along with five other organisations in other EEC (later EU) Member States (Dierenbescherming in the Netherlands, Deutscher Tierschutzbund in Germany, Dyrenes Beskyttelse in Denmark, La Société Protectrice des Animaux (SPA) in France and Lëtzebuerger Déiereschutzliga in Luxembourg) after noticing that more and more legislation relating to animals was being decided at a European level. It is one of the longest established lobby groups in Brussels, and has grown over the years to represent animal protection organisations in 26 of the 27 Member States of the European Union, as well as in several third countries, including Britain, Switzerland, Norway, Serbia, the United States and Australia.

It seized on the European Union's expansion into central and east Europe to support animal protection organisations there. Several global organisations such as Animals International, Compassion in World Farming and World Animal Protection are also members of Eurogroup for Animals.

References

External links
Eurogroup for Animals

Animal charities
Animal welfare organisations based in Belgium